The tables list the Malayalam films released in theaters in the year 2017. Premiere shows and film festival screenings are not considered as releases for this list.

Released films

Dubbed films

Notable deaths

References

2017
2017
Malayalam
Malayalam